Baume-les-Messieurs is a commune in the Jura department in the region of Bourgogne-Franche-Comté in eastern France.

The village lies within the most extensive of the steephead valleys of the Jura escarpment, the Reculée de Baume.  It is therefore almost surrounded by limestone cliffs about 200m high. One of the source rivers of the Seille, the Seille de Baume, has its source within the Reculée and flows through the village.  A short tributary of the Seille de Baume, the Dard, merges with the Seille at Baume; at the source of the Dard, also within the Reculée, there is a notable series of caves.

The village is dominated by the former Baume Abbey, and in consequence has a significant tourist trade, though this mainly involves day visitors.  Conducted tours both of the abbey and of the Dard caves are offered.  The GR 59 long-distance footpath passes through the village.

Population

See also
Baume Abbey
Communes of the Jura department

References

External links
Tourist information for the upper Seille valley (in French)

Communes of Jura (department)
Plus Beaux Villages de France